The Lizzie McGuire Movie is a soundtrack album to the 2003 film The Lizzie McGuire Movie. It was released on April 22, 2003, by Walt Disney Records.

Music
It is composed primarily of songs from (or inspired by) the film, including Hilary Duff's "Why Not" and her sister Haylie's "Girl in the Band". "Why Not" was released to Radio Disney on April 15, 2003. It was released in Australia and Europe on June 23, 2003. A version of "Why Not" featuring different lyrics in the first verse was later included on Duff's second studio album, Metamorphosis. Duff referred to "Why Not" as "a song that I really love. It's really fun, and about just letting loose, so it's really cool".

Critical reception
Heather Phares of AllMusic called The Lizzie McGuire Movie Soundtrack a "fun but not especially memorable soundtrack".

Commercial performance
Two weeks after its release, The Lizzie McGuire Movie was certified gold by the Recording Industry Association of America (RIAA) for shipments of over 500,000 copies in the United States. The soundtrack was number ten on the week of May 14, selling 92,900 copies, which was 30% gain over the previous week. The next week saw a sales decrease of 16% to 78,000 copies, despite raising two spots to number eight. On the week of May 28, the soundtrack remained at number eight, selling an additional 77,000 copies. The album has been certified platinum by the CRIA, and 2× platinum by the RIAA for selling 2,000,000 copies in the U.S.

Track listing

Notes
 – indicates executive producer
 – indicates co-producer
 – indicates remixer

Charts

Weekly charts

Year-end charts

Certifications

Score

The Lizzie McGuire Movie score was composed by Cliff Eidelman, and has never received any commercial release.

Track listing

References

External links
Article about "Why Not" on TotalGirl! Australia
Walt Disney Records | Lizzie McGuire Movie Soundtrack
Walt Disney Records - The Lizzie McGuire Movie Soundtrack (Internet Archive)

2003 soundtrack albums
Comedy film soundtracks
Disney film soundtracks
Lizzie McGuire